WAPA may refer to:

 WAPA (AM), a radio station (1260 AM) licensed to serve Ponce, Puerto Rico
 WAPA-TV, a television station (channel 4 virtual/27 digital) licensed to serve San Juan, Puerto Rico
 WBQN, a radio station (680 AM) licensed to serve San Juan, Puerto Rico, which held the WAPA call sign from 1947 to 2022
 WMTI (AM), a radio station (1160 AM) licensed to serve Barceloneta-Manatí, Puerto Rico, which held the WAPA call sign from May to June 2022
 Western Area Power Administration, a United States Federal Government Administration within the Department of Energy
 Warsaw Pact, an organization of communist states created in 1955 to counter NATO
 Amahai Airport, in Amahai, West Papua, Indonesia (ICAO code WAPA)
 World Apple and Pear Association, an industry body representing major apple and pear producing countries globally